No. 65 Squadron was a squadron of the Royal Air Force.

First World War
The squadron was first formed at Wyton on 1 August 1916 as a squadron of the Royal Flying Corps with a core provided from the training station at Norwich. It served as a training unit as part of the Norwich based No. 7 Training Wing until equipping with Sopwith Camels and transferring to France as an operational fighter squadron in October 1917. By the end of the First World War, it had claimed about 200 victories. Thirteen aces had served with it, including :
John Inglis Gilmour, 
Joseph White, 
Maurice Newnham, 
Thomas Williams, 
William Harry Bland, 
Alfred Leitch,
Jack Armand Cunningham, 
Godfrey Brembridge, and 
George M. Cox.
Arthur G. Jones-Williams, who would go on to long-range flight record attempts in 1929, also served in the squadron.

Second World War

The squadron reformed in 1934 at RAF Hornchurch with the Hawker Demon, converting to the Gloster Gauntlet in 1936 and the Gloster Gladiator in 1937. During World War II, the squadron operated Supermarine Spitfires, having converted from Gladiators in 1939. In December 1943, the squadron converted to North American Mustangs. For a period of time their Wing Commander was Reg Grant.

Post war
In 1946, the unit converted to the Spitfire LF.XVIe and then the de Havilland Hornet, the Gloster Meteor F.4 and F.8, then the Hawker Hunter F.6 (December 1956) at RAF Duxford from August 1952 until the squadron disbanded on 31 March 1961, and then reformed in 1964 as a surface-to-air missile unit, operating the Bristol Bloodhound. During this period, it was based at RAF Seletar, Singapore, and it disbanded again in 1970. From 1970, No. 65 Squadron became the reserve squadron number for No. 226 Operational Conversion Unit RAF at RAF Coltishall, until its disbandment in the mid 1970s. It was thereafter the reserve squadron number of No. 229 Operational Conversion Unit RAF at RAF Coningsby.  It was last disbanded at RAF Coningsby in June 1992, by re-numbering as No. 56 (Reserve) Squadron, after serving as the Operational conversion unit for the Panavia Tornado F.2 and F.3 interceptor, with the alternative identity of No. 229 Operational Conversion Unit RAF.

References

Citations

Bibliography

 Jefford, C.G. RAF Squadrons, a Comprehensive Record of the Movement and Equipment of all RAF Squadrons and their Antecedents since 1912. Shrewsbury: Airlife Publishing, 1998 (second edition 2001). .

External links

 Royal Air Force History: History of No. 65 Squadron
 Air of Authority: No 61 – 65 Squadron Histories

065 Squadron
065 Squadron
Military units and formations established in 1916
Military units and formations disestablished in 1992
1916 establishments in the United Kingdom